Samraniya is a town located in Shahabad tehsil (block) of Baran district in Rajasthan, India.

Demographics 
According to Population Census 2011, there are 859 families residing in the town, And the population of the town is 4,339 of which 2,218 are males and 2,121 are females.

References

Cities and towns in Baran district